The Sierra Maestra is a mountain range that runs westward across the south of the old Oriente Province in southeast Cuba, rising abruptly from the coast. The range falls mainly within the Santiago de Cuba and in Granma Provinces. Some view it as a series of connecting ranges (Vela, Santa Catalina, Quemado Grande, Daña Mariana), which join with others to the west. At 1,974 m (6,476 ft), Pico Turquino is the range's – and the country's – highest point. The area is rich in minerals, especially copper, manganese, chromium, and iron.

History
The Sierra Maestra has a long history of guerrilla warfare, starting with the resistance of the Taínos under Guamá (died 1532), the Cimarrón Neo-Taíno nations escaped slave cultures, the Ten Years' War (1868–1878) and the Cuban War of Independence (1895–1898), and various minor conflicts such as the Race War of 1912, and the uprisings of Antonio Guiteras (died 1935) against Gerardo Machado (President of Cuba from 1925 to 1933) and Fulgencio Batista (President 1940–1944 and 1952–1959). After Fidel Castro returned to Cuba in 1956 from exile in Mexico, he and the few other survivors from the failed 1953 attack on Moncada Barracks hid in the Sierra Maestra. There they succeeded in expanding their 26th of July Movement, starting a revolution throughout the region. They built up guerrilla columns, and in collaboration with other groups in the central provinces, Escopeteros on the foot-hills and plains, and the urban resistance, eventually overthrew Batista on 1 January 1959.

Ornithology
Calls of the ivory-billed woodpecker, now possibly extinct, were reported but not confirmed in the Sierra Maestra in 1998.

See also

 Geography of Cuba
 Turquino National Park

References
Notes

Sources
 Achenbach, Joel and Peter Essic (photographer) 2006 The next big one and special supplement (map): Earthquake risk Zones. Nation Geographic  209(4, April), 120–147 and map.
 Anderson, Jon Lee 1997. Che Guevara: A Revolutionary Life. Bantam Press,  or Grove Press, 
 AP Latin America January 22, 2005 Ship Begins Sound Wave Research Off Yucatan
 Braddock, Daniel M. 1958 Revolutionary Activity in Western Oriente Province. Despatch From the Embassy in Cuba to the Department of State.  No. 656 Havana, February 18, 1958 http://www.latinamericanstudies.org/cable/cable-2-18-58.htm
 Carney, Bob revised July 11, 2005 Explorations: Gulf of Mexico: Background Geological Setting. Louisiana State University National Oceanic and Atmospheric Administration | U.S. Department of Commerce http://oceanexplorer.noaa.gov/explorations/02mexico/background/geology/geology.html
 Castellanos Garcia, Gerardo 1927. "Tierras y Glorias de Oriente (Calixto Garcia Iñiguez)" Editorial Hermes Havana p. 155.
 Castro Medel, Osviel and Aldo Daniel Naranjo 2003 (accessed 3-21-06) 490 aniversario Ciudad India y Rebelde (Bayamo).  La Demajagua https://web.archive.org/web/20051023220835/http://www.lademajagua.co.cu/infgran778.htm
 Cazanas X. ; Barrabi H. ; Melgarejo J.C. ; Luna J.A.  1998.   El deposito volcanogenico de Cu-Zn-Pb-Au El Cobre, Cuba Oriental: Estructura y mineralogía The Cu-Zn-Pb-Au volcanogenic deposit El Cobre, Western Cuba (sic): Structure and mineralogy Source: Acta Geológica Hispánica 33 (1–4). 277–333.
 Cazanas X.; Escusa A.; Cuba S.; Melgarejo J.C.; Alfonso P.1998  Un modelo de deposito vulcanogenico de manganeso del arco volcanico Paleogeno de Cuba: El ejemplo de la region Cristo-Ponupo-Los Chivos A model of manganese volcanogenic deposit from the Paleogene volcanic island arc of Cuba: The case of the Cristo-Ponupo-Los Chivos region ,Acta Geológica Hispánica 33 (1–4) 239–276
 Cazanas X.; Lewis J.; Melgarejo J.C.; Proenza J.A.; Mattietti Kysar G. 1998 Rocas volcanicas de las series Inferior y Media del Grupo El Cobre en la Sierra Maestra (Cuba Oriental): Volcanismo generado en un arco de islas tholeiitico Volcanic rocks from the lower and intermediate series of the El Cobre Group, Sierra Maestra, Eastern Cuba: A case of island arc tholeiites Source: Acta Geológica Hispánica 33 (1–4)  57–74
 Chiappy-Jhones C., Rico-Gray V.; Gama L.; and  Giddings L. 2001  Floristic affinities between the Yucatán peninsula and some karstic areas of Cuba. Journal of Biogeography 28 (4) 535–542
 Duarte Oropesa, José 1989 Historiología Cubana. Ediciones Universal Miami Vol 1. , All volumes 
 Enamorado, Calixto 1917 Tiempos. Heroicos Persecucion. Rambla, Bauza and Company, Havana.
 Guevara, Ernesto Che 1958 (re-accessed 22 March 2006) Pino del Agua, II. Che Guevara  http://chehasta.narod.ru/pda2.htm.
 James, Daniel 2001 Che Guevara. Cooper Square Press. New York 
 Kueny, J.A. 1998 An assessment of protected karst landscapes in the Caribbean Caribbean Geography 9 (.2). 87–100.
 Lescaille Durand, Lisván 2003 (accessed 3-22-06) Puede ser el cacique Guamá. Cuba Una identità in movimento https://web.archive.org/web/20070519175949/http://freeweb.supereva.com/carlo260/guama.html?p
 Marrero, Levi 1981 5th edition "Geografia de Cuba" La Moderna Poesia, Coral Gables Florida.
 Maso, Calixto C. 1998 Historia De Cuba. Ediciones Universal. 3rd Edition Miami 
 McGuire, Bill 2005 Global disaster paves way for global thinking. Geographical,. 77 (3) 14–18.
 Mora, Pedro 2003 (re accessed 22 March 2006) Aniversario 45 de Pino del Agua II. Importante golpe de la guerrilla.  Verde Olivo https://web.archive.org/web/20030826173750/http://www.venceremos.cubaweb.cu/Textos/importante_golpe_dela_guerrilla_verde_olivo.htm
 Morán Arce, Lucas 1980 La revolución cubana, 1953–1959: Una versión rebelde. Imprenta Universitaria, Universidad Católica de Puerto Rico. Ponce, Puerto Rico.  ISBN B0000EDAW9
 MVC 2005 Investiga Cuba restos de meteorite Notimex. El Universal Viernes 11 de noviembre de 2005 El Universal Online, México. https://web.archive.org/web/20051125004751/http://www.eluniversal.com.mx/articulos/26483.html
 Naranjo Tamayo, Aldo Daniel and Luis Carlos Palacios Leyva 2004 (Accessed 3-21-06) San Salvador de Bayamo: Proceso fundacional de la segunda villa cubana San Salvador de Bayamo. La Demajagua 3 de noviembre de 2004 https://web.archive.org/web/20071114063001/http://www.lademajagua.co.cu/bayamo.htm
 Goreau, P. D. E.  1983 Tectonic Evolution of the North Central Caribbean Plate Margin.  Woods Hole Oceanographic Institution, Massachusetts.; Massachusetts Inst. of Tech., Cambridge. Sponsor: National Science Foundation, Washington, D.C.. September 1983. 248p. Report: WHOI-83-34
 Rojas-Consuegra, R. 2005 Paleobiogeografía de los Rudistas (Moluscos Cretácicos) reportados en el territorio cubano. I Convención Cubana de Ciencias de la Tierra. GEOCIENCIAS’ 2005. Memorias, Trabajos y Resúmenes. Centro Nacional de Información Geológica. IGP. La Habana. CD ROM. 2005. GEO08-P6: 1–15. .
 Rojas-Consuegra, R. 2005 Estratigrafía, Tafonomía y Paleoecología de los Rudistas (Moluscos Cretácicos) en el territorio cubano. I Convención Cubana de Ciencias de la Tierra. GEOCIENCIAS’ 2005. Memorias, Trabajos y Resúmenes. Centro Nacional de Información Geológica. IGP. La Habana. CD ROM. 2005. GEO08-2: 1–36. .
 Rojas-Consuegra, R., M. A. Iturralde-Vinent, C. Díaz-Otero y D. García-Delgado 2005 Significación paleogeográfica de la brecha basal del Límite K/T en Loma Dos Hermanas (Loma Capiro), en Santa Clara, provincia de Villa Clara. I Convención Cubana de Ciencias de la Tierra. GEOCIENCIAS’ 2005. Memorias, Trabajos y Resúmenes. Centro Nacional de Información Geológica. IGP. La Habana. CD ROM. 2005. GEO08-P7: 1–9. 
 La Rosa Corzo, Gabino (translated by Mary Todd) [1988] 2003 Runaway Slave Settlements in Cuba: Resistance and Repression University of North Carolina Press, Chapel Hill  
 Rousset, Ricardo V. 1918. Historial de Cuba. Libreria Cervantes, Havana, Vol. 3 pp. 137–153.
 Scotese, Christopher R. 1999.  Evolution of the Caribbean Sea (100 mya – Present) Collision of Cuba with Florida Platform and Opening of the Cayman Trough. PALEOMAP Project http://www.scotese.com/caribanim.htm
 Sigurdsson H.; Bralower T.; King J.; Kelley S.; Leckie R.M.; Carey S. 2000 History of circum-Caribbean explosive volcanism: 40Ar/39Ar dating of tephra layers Source: Proceedings of the Ocean Drilling Program: Scientific Results 165, 299–314.
 Takayama H.; Iturralde-Vinent M.A.; Oji T.; Tajika E.; Kiyokawa S.; Garcia D.; Okada H.; Hasegawa T.; Toyoda K.; Tada R.; Matsui T. 2000  Origin of the Penalver Formation in northwestern Cuba and its relation to K/T boundary impact event Sedimentary Geology 135 (1–4) 295–320.
 Whitmarsh, Isabel. 1969. Bayatiquirí Tierra de Alegría, Paz y Amor. Leyenda de la Familia Ciargos de Luna. Libro Primero. Guarenas, Venezuela.

External links

 Cuba's Revolutionary Mountains by Zoë Barnes, The Sunday Times, March 15, 2009
 Music in the Sierra Maestra

Maestra
Geography of Santiago de Cuba Province
Geography of Guantánamo Province
Geography of Granma Province